Floridablanca, officially the Municipality of Floridablanca is a 1st class municipality in the province of Pampanga, Philippines. According to the 2020 census, it has a population of 135,542 people. Floridablanca is a part of the province of the Pampanga located in Central Luzon lying north of Dinalupihan, Bataan and south-southwest of San Fernando, Pampanga.

History

Floridablanca was founded in 1823 at the site of a monastery. In the 1920s, the Pampanga Sugar Mill was built at Del Carmen in the 1920s. The area was the site of military bases of the Philippine Commonwealth Army and the Philippine Constabulary from 1942 to 1946. The Philippine Air Force established Basa Air Base at a former American military airfield in 1947.

Geography
Floridablanca is located on the western part of Pampanga along the Zambales mountain ranges and is bounded by the municipalities of Porac on the north, Lubao on the south, Guagua on the east, and Dinalupihan, Bataan on the west. Floridablanca is north of Dinalupihan, Bataan via Dinalupihan-Floridablanca Access Road at the Bataan-Pampanga boundary line.

Barangays
Floridablanca is politically subdivided into 33 barangays:

Climate

Demographics

Economy 

Floridablanca is the second largest producer of rice in the province. It produces more than enough rice to meet its needs resulting in a surplus. In 1999, only 37.76% of its produce was used for its own rice requirement resulting in a surplus of 65.24% equivalent to 17,553 metric tons.

Government

Like other towns in the Philippines, Floridablanca is governed by a mayor and vice mayor who are elected to three-year terms. The mayor is the executive head and leads the town's departments in executing the ordinances and improving public services. The vice mayor heads a legislative council (Sangguniang Bayan) consisting of councilors from the Barangays of Barrios.

List of municipal leaders

Capitan Municipal
 1897 – Don Gerónimo Romero Dinio
 1898 – Don Cecilio Alvendia
 1899 – Don Alejandro Ramos

Municipal Presidents
 1900–1902 – Don Gerónimo Romero Dinio
 1903–1905 – Don Alejandro Ramos
 1906–1908 – Don Gregorio Panlaqui
 1909–1911 – Don León Gutiérrez
 1911 – Don Arcadio Ramírez
 1912–1917 – Don Martin Sundiam
 1918–1922 – Don José O. Dinio
 1923–1925 – Don Isidoro Alvendia
 1926–1931 – Don Roberto Nuguid
 1932–1937 – Don Camilo Ocampo

Municipal Mayors
 1938–1940 – Geronimo Dinio Coronel
 1941 – Benigno Layug
 1942–1943 – Francisco Vargas
 1943–1944 – Fidel Pekson
 1944 – Leandro Garcia
 1945 – Benigno Layug
 1945 – Dr. Vicente Chincuanco
 1945–1946 – Mariano Macabulos
 1946–1947 – Arsenio T. Isip
 1948–1951 – Mariano Macabulos
 1951–1955 – Dominador Diyco Songco
 1956–1959 – Atty. Marcelo Dungca Mendiola
 1960–1967 – Dominador Diyco Songco
 1968–1971 – Jose Dungca Mendiola
 1972–1986 – Pedro Manuel Capulong
 1986–1992 – Tito Morales Mendiola
 1992–2001 – Pedro Manuel Capulong
 2001–2004 – Joerey Montemayor
 2004–2007 – Darwin Manalansan
 2007–2016 – Eduardo Guerrero
 2016–present – Darwin Manalansan

Tourism
Aside from Basa Air Base, the town has cultural treasures and interesting points.
 1887 San Jose Obrero Parish Church: the Roman Catholic Archdiocese of San Fernando exercises jurisdiction over the Heritage Church.
 Bahay na Puti (Alvendia House): the Justice Carmelino Alvendia, Sr. ancestral mansion is owned, preserved and maintained by his family.

Notable personalities

 Leandro Coronel, news reporter/columnist and book author
 Dante Rivero, movie actor
 Jillian Ward, actress
 Jessica Rose McEwen, model and beauty queen
 Justice Carmelino Alvendia, Sr.
 Reynaldo Vitug Reyes, a native of Maligaya, Floridablanca a Major General of the Philippine Air Force (PAF) and known as the first Floridablancan Air Force General
Rhea Santos, newsreader from GMA and OMNI

Gallery

References

External links

Floridablanca Profile at PhilAtlas.com
Official site
[ Philippine Standard Geographic Code]
Philippine Census Information
Local Governance Performance Management System 

Municipalities of Pampanga
Populated places established in 1867
1967 establishments in the Philippines